Strauzia intermedia is a species of tephritid or fruit flies in the genus Strauzia of the family Tephritidae. It develops in Rudbeckia laciniata.

References

intermedia
Insects described in 1873